Salvelinus elgyticus is a species of fish in the salmon family, Salmonidae. It is a member of genus Salvelinus, the chars. It is known commonly as the small-mouth char. It is endemic to Lake El'gygytgyn in eastern Siberia in Russia.

Description
Little is known about its habits and life cycle.

Biology
This cold water fish is named after its native lake, which is located in Chukotka, Russian Federation. This species and its relative, the long-finned char (Salvethymus svetovidovi) are limited to this remote lake, which is an impact crater. They are adapted to its very cold waters, which are generally just above the freezing point. The surface is frozen for about 10 months of the year. It may start to melt in the summer, but some years it never fully thaws. This fish spends most of the year in total darkness.

Salvelinus elgyticus is considered a threatened species by some authors, but it has not yet been evaluated by International Union for Conservation of Nature.

References

External links
Salvelinus elgyticus illustration. The Red Book of the Russian Federation.

elgyticus
Chukotka Autonomous Okrug
Endemic fauna of Russia
Fauna of Siberia
Cold water fish
Fish described in 1981